Teglio is a small village (curazia) of San Marino. It belongs to the municipality of Chiesanuova.

See also
Chiesanuova
Caladino
Confine
Galavotto
Molarini
Poggio Casalino
Poggio Chiesanuova

Curazie in San Marino
Chiesanuova